The 2011 Asian Canoe Sprint Championships were the 14th Asian Canoe Sprint Championships and took place from October 13–16, 2011 in Azadi Lake, Tehran, Iran.

The event is also the continental qualification for the 2012 Summer Olympics in London.

Medal summary

Men

Women

Medal table

References

External links
Official Website

Canoe Sprint Championships
Asian Canoe Sprint Championships
Asian Canoeing Championships
International sports competitions hosted by Iran